Salto del Agua  is a metro (subway) station on the Mexico City Metro. It is located in the Cuauhtémoc borough in the center of Mexico City. Starting 9 July 2022, the Line 1 station will remain closed for at least eight months for modernization work on the tunnel and the line's technical equipment.

Name and iconography
Its logo represents the Salto del Agua fountain. This fountain is at the end of the old Chapultepec Aqueduct, also known as the Belen aqueduct.  This aqueduct ran from what is now Chapultepec Park, following Chapultepec Avenue and Arcos de Belen (Arches of Belen) Streets ending at this fountain. It lies on the border of the historic center, Colonia Doctores and Colonia Obrera.  Contrary to popular belief, this fountain is not the original but rather a reproduction.  The original fountain had deteriorated significantly, so architect Guillermo Ruiz was tasked with its reproduction, using the original engraved stone epigraphs as a model.  What is left of the original fountain is in the National Museum of the Viceregal Period in Tepotzotlán.

General information
Salto del Agua is a transfer station and contains a cultural display. It also has two kinds of architecture, one from Line 1 of the Metro, and the other, more modern style, of Line 8. Line 8 exits connect with Eje Central, which is filled in this zone with bookstores, boutiques, electronics shops, and street traders, locally known as vendedores ambulantes or "ambulantaje".

Metro Salto del Agua also transfers to trolleybus line "A", which runs the full length of  Eje Central Lázaro Cárdenas and more, from Metro Autobuses del Norte and Metro Tasqueña – the city's main north and south intercity bus stations.

Inside the station is a mural entitled The Three Workers by artist Jason Schell.

Ridership

Exits

Line 1
North: Avenida Arcos de Belén, Centro
South: Avenida Arcos de Belén, Centro

Line 8
Northeast: Eje Central Lázaro Cárdenas and Plaza de las Vizcainas, Centro
Northwest: Eje Central Lázaro Cárdenas and Delicias street, Centro

References

External links
 

Salto del Agua
Railway stations opened in 1969
1969 establishments in Mexico
Railway stations opened in 1994
1994 establishments in Mexico
Mexico City Metro Line 8 stations
Mexico City Metro stations in Cuauhtémoc, Mexico City
Accessible Mexico City Metro stations